Ranchester is a town in Sheridan County, Wyoming, United States. The population was 1,064 at the 2020 census.

Geography

Demographics

2010 census
As of the census of 2010, there were 855 people, 312 households, and 236 families living in the town. The racial makeup of the town was 90.3% White, 7.3% Native American, 0.8% Asian, 1.1% from other races, and 0.6% from two or more races. Hispanic or Latino of any race were 3.6% of the population.

There were 312 households, of which 42.6% had children under the age of 18 living with them, 55.8% were married couples living together, 14.7% had a female householder with no husband present, 5.1% had a male householder with no wife present, and 24.4% were non-families. 17.9% of all households were made up of single individuals, and 7% had someone living alone who was 65 years of age or older. The average household size was 2.74 and the average family size was 3.09.

The median age in the town was 31.7 years. 32.5% of residents were under the age of 18; 7.4% were between the ages of 18 and 24; 25.3% were from 25 to 44; 23.6% were from 45 to 64; and 11.2% were 65 years of age or older. The gender makeup of the town was 50.5% male and 49.5% female.

2000 census
As of the census of 2000, there were 701 people, 277 households, and 191 families living in the town. The population density was 1,164.9 people per square mile (451.1/km2). There were 290 housing units at an average density of 481.9 per square mile (186.6/km2). The racial makeup of the town was 89.73% White, 6.42% Native American, 0.14% Pacific Islander, 1.28% from other races, and 2.43% from two or more races. Hispanic or Latino of any race were 4.28% of the population.

There were 277 households, out of which 36.8% had children under the age of 18 living with them, 53.8% were married couples living together, 12.6% had a female householder with no husband present, and 31.0% were non-families. 26.0% of households were made up of single individuals, and 12.6% had someone living alone who was 65 years of age or older. The average household size was 2.53 and the average family size was 3.08.

In the town, the population was spread out, with 30.1% under the age of 18, 7.6% from 18 to 24, 25.0% from 25 to 44, 26.2% from 45 to 64, and 11.1% who were 65 years of age or older. The median age was 37 years. For every 100 females, there were 93.6 males. For every 100 females age 18 and over, there were 90.7 males.

The median income for a household in the town was $36,094, and the median income for a family was $46,389. Males had a median income of $36,875 versus $20,804 for females. The per capita income for the town was $15,421. About 18.2% of families and 16.7% of the population were below the poverty line, including 29.2% of those under age 18 and none of those age 65 or over.

Education
Public education in the town of Ranchester is provided by Sheridan County School District #1. Zoned campuses include Tongue River Elementary (grades K–5), Tongue River Middle School (grades 6–8), and Tongue River High School (grades 9–12).

Ranchester has a public library, a branch of the Sheridan County Public Library System.

Media
Radio

 KROE AM 930
 KWYO AM 1410
 KHRW FM 92.7
 KLGT FM 96.5
 KYTI FM 93.7
 KZWY FM 94.9
 KZZS FM 98.3
 KZMQ-FM 100.3
 KLQQ FM 104.9

Television
Four television stations serve Ranchester: KTVQ (CBS) from Billings, and KTWO (ABC) from Casper. KSWY (NBC) from Casper, and PBS station K15HK-D, which is a local repeater for KCWC-DT in Lander.

See also

 List of municipalities in Wyoming

References

External links

Towns in Sheridan County, Wyoming
Towns in Wyoming